Corleone is a Sicilian town.

Corleone may also refer to:

Corleone family, a fictional family from Sicily that settled in New York. The family was created by Mario Puzo and appears in his 1969 novel The Godfather, as well as its film adaptations
Vito Corleone, a fictional character from the Corleone family
Michael Corleone, a fictional character from the Corleone family
Sonny Corleone, a fictional character from the Corleone family
Fredo Corleone, a fictional character from the Corleone family
Connie Corleone, a fictional character from the Corleone family
Corleonesi Mafia clan, a faction within the Sicilian Mafia
Corleone: A Tale of Sicily (novel), an 1897 novel by Francis Marion Crawford about a family of brigands or maffeusi
Corleone (album), a 2014 album by French rapper Lacrim, or the title track
Corleone (film), 1978 Italian film
Il Capo dei Capi, 2007 Italian TV series, released in Great Britain as "Corleone"